Shannon Lee Tweed Simmons (born March 10, 1957) is a Canadian actress and model. One of the most successful actresses of mainstream erotica, she is identified with the genre of the erotic thriller cinema. Tweed has appeared in more than 60 films and several television series. She was named Playboys Playmate of the Year in 1982.

Tweed is also known for Gene Simmons Family Jewels, a reality TV show that portrayed the life of her family from 2006 until 2012. She is married to Gene Simmons, bassist and co-lead singer of the band Kiss; Tweed and Simmons have two children, Nicholas Adam Tweed-Simmons and Sophie Alexandra Tweed-Simmons.

Early life 

Tweed was born on March 10, 1957, in St. John's, Newfoundland. She is the daughter of Donald Keith Tweed, a mink rancher, and Louise Tweed, and was raised on a mink ranch in Whitbourne. She is one of seven children and has three sisters, including actress Tracy Tweed.

After Donald Tweed fell into a coma after a car crash, Louise moved with her children to her mother's home in Saskatoon, Saskatchewan, and studied nursing while the family survived on welfare. Shannon had breast enhancement surgery at the age of 20 and subsequently became involved in beauty pageants.

Career 

In 1978, Tweed was the third runner-up in the Miss Ottawa event and won the Miss Canada talent competition for her singing.

After the Canadian wish-fulfilment TV show Thrill of a Lifetime arranged for her to pose for Playboy magazine, Tweed was chosen to be the Playmate of the Month for the November 1981 issue, and eventually the Playmate of the Year for 1982. Tweed and her sister Tracy appeared together in a Playboy spread.

Tweed primarily acted in B movies and in television series such as the HBO comedy 1st and Ten and the prime-time soap opera Falcon Crest, She also appeared in an episode of The Dukes of Hazzard as well as Married... with Children. In 1985, she landed a year-long role on Days of Our Lives as Savannah Wilder. Tweed has appeared as a guest on Frasier. She has also lent her voice to the Nickelodeon cartoon SpongeBob SquarePants in the episode "20,000 Patties Under the Sea", which also featured Gene Simmons as a guest.

The first major theatrical film in which Tweed appeared was the horror film Of Unknown Origin (1983). Since then, Tweed has appeared in more than 60 films, including Detroit Rock City, produced by Simmons, in 1999. Tweed and her sister Tracy co-starred in the film Night Eyes 3. She is known as one of the most successful actresses of mainstream erotica. Vanity Fair has described Tweed as "one of home video's most rented erotic thriller goddesses".

Tweed was featured along with her family on the reality TV show Gene Simmons Family Jewels from 2006 until 2012. One of the highlights of the series was Simmons' proposal to her and their subsequent marriage at the Beverly Hills Hotel in Beverly Hills, California. In 2010, an episode of the series was taped in Tweed's former hometown of Saskatoon. During the visit, she was presented with an honorary street sign denoting the (nonexistent) "Tweed Lane". Tourism Saskatoon subsequently requested Saskatoon City Council approve the naming of a real Tweed Lane in her honour. The Council approved the request, and the street is located in the neighbourhood of Rosewood.

Tweed is the narrator of the reality TV show Ex-Wives of Rock.

Personal life 

Tweed resided at the Playboy Mansion for approximately 14 months as Playboy founder Hugh Hefner's partner. The relationship coincided with her Playmate appearances and with being named 1982 Playmate of the Year. The Mansion was the location of her first meeting with her future husband, musician Gene Simmons. Tweed has been in a relationship with Simmons since 1983. In a 2011 interview, Simmons said, "I need Shannon in my life. Not just because of love and family but because she holds me accountable." After 28 years together, the couple wed in an outdoor evening ceremony on the crystal lawn of The Beverly Hills Hotel on October 1, 2011.

Filmography

Films

Television

See also 

 List of people in Playboy 1980–1989

References

External links 

 
 AskMen.com: Shannon Tweed

1957 births
Actresses from Newfoundland and Labrador
Canadian film actresses
Canadian television actresses
Participants in American reality television series
People from St. John's, Newfoundland and Labrador
People from Whitbourne, Newfoundland and Labrador
1980s Playboy Playmates
Playboy Playmates of the Year
Living people
People from Newfoundland (island)